The case of Juana Rivas is a judicial dispute between Juana Rivas and her then partner, Francesco Arcuri. The case involved judges from Spain and Italy, as Rivas resided in the city of Granada, in Andalusia, while Arcuri did so in Italy.

It gained a notable political and journalistic repercussion because it involved a case of gender violence by Arcuri against Juana Rivas, at the same time that she was convicted of child abduction due to her refusal to allow the children to return to Italy with their father. Media in Spain offered wide  coverage of the case, generally in positions favorable to those of Juana Rivas. At the same time, successive demonstrations took place in Spain in support of the mother, under feminist slogans backed by personalities and political parties. 

The first judicial order was in December 2016, forcing Juana Rivas to hand over her children to their habitual residence in Italy, which was ratified by the Granada Court in April 2017. In July of that same year, a new date was set for the delivery of the children, which happened in August, when they returned to Italy, where they remained thereafter after a search and arrest warrant was issued against Rivas. In July 2018, Juana Rivas was sentenced to five years in prison and the payment of a compensation.

Context

Previous complaints
Juana Rivas and Francisco Arcuri met in 2004 in London and they dated for three years, with Arcuri moving to Spain.

In 2009, Rivas and Arcuri had a domestic dispute in which Juana Rivas suffered from hand damage, filling a complaint for abuse against Arcuri. Arcuri also denounced her for mistreatment as he had injuries in his thigh and neck. Both reached an agreement in which Arcuri admitted a crime of injuries and he was sentenced to three months in prison and a restraining order of one year and three months. He later said to regret this agreement.

Arcuri would not enter prison and, after a year of separation and in breach of the restraining order, Juana and Arcuri started back living together again in the small town of Carloforte, on the island of San Pietro, in Sardinia, where they had a second child.

Case of Juana Rivas
In May 2016, Juana Rivas left Carloforte and went to Maracena, a town in Granada, with her two children under the pretext of seeing her family. According to her, the trigger for this decision would have been "the daily situation of oppression, isolation and mistreatment for more than two years". Rivas would have deceived Arcuri by claiming to be ill and unable to return on the scheduled date.

In July 2016, Juana Rivas filed the first complaint with the Maracena Civil Guard for alleged physical and psychological abuse inflicted by Francesco Arcuri, but it was dismissed.

In December 2016, Juana Rivas again issued a complaint against her partner for abuse, this time adding that her eldest son would have also been a victim of this. At the same time, on December 14, a court of Granada ordered Rivas the "immediate restitution" of the children with their father back to Italy, a resolution that became final in April 2017, after Arcuri issued and obtained the guardianship and custody of minors by the Court of Cagliari in June 2017.

From then on, the media significance of the Juana Rivas court case began. Rivas obtained 150000 signs asking that her children were not send to Italy. After several months, in April 2017 the Court dismissed Rivas's appeal and again ordered the "immediate restitution" to Italy, ordering the delivery of the minors on July 26. On July 26, Rivas went into hiding with her children.

Under the hashtag «#juanaestaenmicasa», ("#juanaisinmyhouse") there was great wave of demonstrations throughout the Spanish in support of Rivas.
 In her decision to evade justice, Juana Rivas received the support of the highest Andalusian political authorities, such as that of the president Susana Díaz or the leader of the Podemos party , Teresa Rodríguez.

Rivas did not attend the new court summoning and was detained on August, 22. On August 28, Juana Rivas will gave the minors to Francesco Arcuri, who took them to Italy. On July 27, 2018, Juana Rivas is sentenced to five years in prison, six years of disqualification from exercising parental authority, 30,000 euros of compensation to her ex-partner and the payment of legal costs. The judge would have estimated that Rivas committed two crimes of abduction of minors, finding no mitigation in the complaints of abuse as he had not obtained the veracity of any of them. In 2019, the Italian Prosecutor's Office filed the eight complaints of mistreatment that Juana Rivas made against Arcuri between 2016 and 2018, stating that "the narration of the extraordinary violence is absolutely implausible." The court ruling would dictate that Juana Rivas would have used her children as "human shields", whom she would have "psychologically manipulated to oppose her father" by reporting episodes of abuse by Arcuri of her children that she would not have been able to prove.

After the sentence
In October 2018, Juana Rivas decided to no longer use the services of the one who, until that moment, had been her lawyer during the entire case, José Estanislao López. That same month, Juana again failed to deliver the children to Arcuri, taking refuge in a friend's house near Cagliari and arguing that she will only return them when a judge forces her. López said that it must be the environment of Rivas, specifically Francisca Granados and the Maracena Women's Center, the ones  guiding Juana's defense, including the acts outside legality.

In April 2021, the Supreme Court reduced the sentence to two and a half years in prison, confirming the penalty of six years of withdrawal of parental authority and the payment of compensation of 12,000 euros for the moral and material damage caused to the father of the minors.

She entered on a insertion center to go to prison on 11 June, 2021. On June 15, 2021, he left the Center to serve his sentence at home with a telematic bracelet, as the General Secretariat of Penitentiary Institutions applied article 86.4 of the Penitentiary Regulations.

In the Council of Ministers held on November 16, 2021, Juana Rivas was granted a partial pardon, so her sentence was reduced to a prison term of one year and three months. Also, the penalty of disqualification from exercising parental authority is changed for a penalty of 180 days of community service.

In March 2022, the Court of Granada suspended her prison sentence on the condition that she must not commit a new crime for a period of three years and that she has to participate in positive parenting programs.

References

Trials in Spain
Trials in Italy
Violence against women in Spain